Treat Huey and Frederik Nielsen were the defending champions but chose to defend their title with different partners. Huey partnered Robert Lindstedt but lost in the final to James Cerretani and Neal Skupski. Nielsen partnered Andreas Siljeström but lost in the semifinals to Huey and Lindstedt.

Cerretani and Skupski won the title after defeating Huey and Lindstedt 7–6(8–6), 6–2 in the final.

Seeds

Draw

References
 Main Draw

Odlum Brown Vancouver Open
Vancouver Open